The 1957–58 Connecticut Huskies men's basketball team represented the University of Connecticut in the 1957–58 collegiate men's basketball season. The Huskies completed the season with a 17–10 overall record. The Huskies were members of the Yankee Conference, where they ended the season with a 9–1 record. They were the Yankee Conference regular season champions and made it to the first round in the 1958 NCAA Division I men's basketball tournament. The Huskies played their home games at Hugh S. Greer Field House in Storrs, Connecticut, and were led by twelve-year head coach Hugh Greer.

Schedule 

|-
!colspan=12 style=""| Regular Season

|-
!colspan=12 style=""| NCAA Tournament

Schedule Source:

References 

UConn Huskies men's basketball seasons
Connecticut
Connecticut
1957 in sports in Connecticut
1958 in sports in Connecticut